Yŏnggwang station is a railway station in Yŏnggwang-ŭp, Yŏnggwang county, South Hamgyŏng province, North Korea on the Sinhŭng Line of the Korean State Railway, and is the starting point of the narrow gauge Changjin Line. There are facilities for servicing the locomotives and rolling stock of the narrow gauge line here, as well as a six-track transloading yard between the standard and narrow gauge lines.

History 
The station, originally called Oro station, was opened on 10 June 1923 by the Sinhŭng Railway as part of the  first section of its Hamnam Line between Hamhŭng and Yonggwang. The Sinhŭng Railway was bought and absorbed by the Chosen Railway on 22 April 1938. It received its current name after the establishment of the DPRK.

References

Railway stations in North Korea